The Offences Against the Person Act 1828 (9 Geo. 4 c. 31) (also known as Lord Lansdowne's Act) was an Act of the Parliament of the United Kingdom of Great Britain and Ireland. It consolidated provisions in the law related to offences against the person (an expression which, in particular, includes offences of violence) from a number of earlier statutes into a single Act. It was part of the criminal law reforms known collectively as "Peel's Acts", passed with the objective of simplifying the law.  Among the laws it replaced was clause XXVI of Magna Carta, the first time any part of Magna Carta was repealed, and the Buggery Act 1533. It also abolished the crime of petty treason.

The Act only applied to England and Wales (then described as England). A similar statute was passed for Ireland the following year (10 Geo. 4 c. 34).

A number of the Act's provisions were repealed and replaced by the Offences against the Person Act 1837. The death penalty for shooting, stabbing, cutting or wounding with intent (s.12), and for post-quickening abortions (s.13) under this Act was abolished by repeal of those sections by section 1 of the 1837 Act (sections 12 and 13 of this act were replaced by sections 4 and 6 of the 1837 Act, respectively).

The death penalty for rape (s.16) and carnal knowledge of a girl under ten (s.17) was abolished by amendment of those sections by section 3 of the Substitution of Punishments of Death Act 1841. Section 18 made provision in relation to proof of carnal knowledge.

The Act was wholly replaced by the Offences against the Person Act 1861.

Under the Offences Against the Person Act of 1828, several sections pertained to the crime of rape. The penalty for being convicted of rape was still death, and remained so until 1841. The Act also made it a felony punishable by death to carnally know a girl under the age of ten. Carnally knowing a girl over the age of ten and under the age of twelve was a misdemeanour punishable with imprisonment with the option of hard labour for a term to be determined by the court.  

The Act also affirmed that proof of penetration was sufficient to reach the conclusion that one person had had carnal knowledge of another; before the 1828 statute, victims of rape had to prove that the perpetrator ejaculated. Historian Anna Clark has argued that medical experts used ejaculation as proof of rape because it was tangible evidence that reduced the need for a victim's testimony. Clark also contends that requiring proof of ejaculation allowed judges and magistrates to ask victims humiliating and explicit questions. By changing the definition of carnal knowledge from ejaculation to proof of penetration, the 1828 act made it a little easier for victims to prosecute their rapists. Records show that from 1828 to 1841, 63 defendants accused of rape were tried at the Old Bailey. Of those 63 defendants, 16 were found guilty and 12 were sentenced to death. Three had their sentenced reduced to imprisonment, and one had his judgment respited altogether.

The Act and its focus on interpersonal violence also had the effect of increasing formal accusations of domestic violence, by reducing the stigma surrounding such activity and diminishing judicial delays.

See also
Offences Against the Person Act

References
The Cabinet Lawyer, 4th Ed, 1828, p 12; 6th Ed, 1830, p 355.
"Lord Lansdowne's Act". The Law Magazine. Second Edition of Volume 1. 1830. Article XIII. Page 129.

External links
 The Offences against the Person Act 1828, as originally enacted, The Statutes at Large, 1828 (from Google Book Search).

English criminal law
Offences against the person
United Kingdom abortion law
United Kingdom Acts of Parliament 1828
1828 in British law
Repealed United Kingdom Acts of Parliament
LGBT law in the United Kingdom